The Oberösterreichrundfahrt is a cycling race held annually in the Austrian state Upper Austria. It was created in 2010 and is part of the UCI Europe Tour as a category 2.2 race.

Winners

References

External links
 

Cycle races in Austria
Recurring sporting events established in 2010
2010 establishments in Austria
UCI Europe Tour races